Phobos is the innermost and larger of the two natural satellites of Mars, the other being Deimos. The two moons were discovered in 1877 by American astronomer Asaph Hall. It is named after Phobos, the Greek god of fear and panic, who is the son of Ares (Mars) and twin brother of Deimos.

Phobos orbits  from the Martian surface, closer to its primary body than any other known planetary moon. It is so close that it orbits Mars much faster than Mars rotates, and completes an orbit in just 7 hours and 39 minutes. As a result, from the surface of Mars it appears to rise in the west, move across the sky in 4 hours and 15 minutes or less, and set in the east, twice each Martian day.

Phobos is one of the least reflective bodies in the Solar System, with an albedo of just 0.071. The defining surface feature is the large impact crater, Stickney, which takes up a substantial proportion of the moon's surface. The surface is also home to many grooves, with there being numerous theories as to how these grooves were formed.

Images and models indicate that Phobos may be a rubble pile held together by a thin crust that is being torn apart by tidal interactions. Phobos gets closer to Mars by about 2 cm per year, and it is predicted that within 30 to 50 million years it will either collide with the planet or break up into a planetary ring.

Discovery 

Phobos was discovered by astronomer Asaph Hall on 18 August 1877 at the United States Naval Observatory in Washington, D.C., at about 09:14 Greenwich Mean Time. (Contemporary sources, using the pre-1925 astronomical convention that began the day at noon, give the time of discovery as 17 August at 16:06 Washington mean time, meaning 18 August 04:06 in the modern convention.) Hall had discovered Deimos, Mars's other moon, a few days earlier on 12 August 1877 at about 07:48 UTC. The names, originally spelled Phobus and Deimus respectively, were suggested by Henry Madan (1838–1901), science master at Eton College, based on Greek mythology, in which Phobos is a companion to the god, Ares.

Shklovsky's "Hollow Phobos" hypothesis 
In the late 1950s and 1960s, the unusual orbital characteristics of Phobos led to speculations that it might be hollow. Around 1958, Russian astrophysicist Iosif Samuilovich Shklovsky, studying the secular acceleration of Phobos's orbital motion, suggested a "thin sheet metal" structure for Phobos, a suggestion which led to speculations that Phobos was of artificial origin. In a February 1960 letter to the journal Astronautics, Fred Singer, then science advisor to U.S. President Dwight D. Eisenhower, said of Shklovsky's theory:
If the satellite is indeed spiraling inward as deduced from astronomical observation, then there is little alternative to the hypothesis that it is hollow and therefore Martian made. The big 'if' lies in the astronomical observations; they may well be in error. Since they are based on several independent sets of measurements taken decades apart by different observers with different instruments, systematic errors may have influenced them.

Subsequently, the systematic data errors that Singer predicted were found to exist, and the claim was called into doubt, and accurate measurements of the orbit available by 1969 showed that the discrepancy did not exist. Singer's critique was justified when earlier studies were discovered to have used an overestimated value of 5 cm/yr for the rate of altitude loss, which was later revised to 1.8 cm/yr. The secular acceleration is now attributed to tidal effects, which create drag on the moon and therefore cause it spiral inward.

The density of Phobos has now been directly measured by spacecraft to be 1.887 g/cm3. Current observations are consistent with Phobos being a rubble pile. In addition, images obtained by the Viking probes in the 1970s clearly showed a natural object, not an artificial one. Nevertheless, mapping by the Mars Express probe and subsequent volume calculations do suggest the presence of voids and indicate that it is not a solid chunk of rock but a porous body. The porosity of Phobos was calculated to be 30% ± 5%, or a quarter to a third being empty.

Physical characteristics 

Phobos does not have an atmosphere due to its low mass and low gravity. It is one of the least reflective bodies in the Solar System, with an albedo of about 0.071. Infrared spectra show that it has carbon-rich material found in carbonaceous chondrites, and its composition shows similarities to that of Mars' surface. Phobos's density is too low to be solid rock, and it is known to have significant porosity. These results led to the suggestion that Phobos might contain a substantial reservoir of ice. Spectral observations indicate that the surface regolith layer lacks hydration, but ice below the regolith is not ruled out.

Unlike Deimos, Phobos is heavily cratered, with one of the craters near the equator having a central peak despite the moon's small size. As with Mimas's crater Herschel, the impact that created Stickney must have nearly shattered Phobos.

Many grooves and streaks also cover the oddly shaped surface. Analysis of results from the Mars Express spacecraft, however, revealed that the grooves are not in fact radial to Stickney, but are centered on the leading apex of Phobos in its orbit (which is not far from Stickney). Researchers suspect that they have been excavated by material ejected into space by impacts on the surface of Mars. The grooves thus formed as crater chains, and all of them fade away as the trailing apex of Phobos is approached. They have been grouped into 12 or more families of varying age, presumably representing at least 12 Martian impact events. However, in November 2018, following further computational probability analysis, astronomers concluded that the many grooves on Phobos were caused by boulders, ejected from the asteroid impact that created Stickney crater. These boulders rolled in a predictable pattern on the surface of the moon.

Faint dust rings produced by Phobos and Deimos have long been predicted but attempts to observe these rings have, to date, failed. Recent images from Mars Global Surveyor indicate that Phobos is covered with a layer of fine-grained regolith at least 100 meters thick; it is hypothesized to have been created by impacts from other bodies, but it is not known how the material stuck to an object with almost no gravity.

The unique Kaidun meteorite that fell on a Soviet military base in Yemen in 1980 has been hypothesized to be a piece of Phobos, but this has been difficult to verify because little is known about the exact composition of Phobos.

A person who weighs 68 kilogram-force (150 pounds) on Earth would weigh about 40 gram-force (2 ounces) standing on the surface of Phobos.

Named geological features 

Geological features on Phobos are named after astronomers who studied Phobos and people and places from Jonathan Swift's Gulliver's Travels.

Craters on Phobos 
A number of craters have been named, and are listed in the following table.

Other named features 
There is one named regio, Laputa Regio, and one named planitia, Lagado Planitia; both are named after places in Gulliver's Travels (the fictional Laputa, a flying island, and Lagado, imaginary capital of the fictional nation Balnibarbi). The only named ridge on Phobos is Kepler Dorsum, named after the astronomer Johannes Kepler.

Orbital characteristics 

The orbital motion of Phobos has been intensively studied, making it "the best studied natural satellite in the Solar System" in terms of orbits completed. Its close orbit around Mars produces some unusual effects. Therefore, from the point of view of an observer on the surface of Mars, it rises in the west, moves comparatively rapidly across the sky (in 4 h 15 min or less) and sets in the east, approximately twice each Martian day (every 11 h 6 min). Because it is close to the surface and in an equatorial orbit, it cannot be seen above the horizon from latitudes greater than 70.4°. Its orbit is so low that its angular diameter, as seen by an observer on Mars, varies visibly with its position in the sky. Seen at the horizon, Phobos is about 0.14° wide; at zenith it is 0.20°, one-third as wide as the full Moon as seen from Earth. By comparison, the Sun has an apparent size of about 0.35° in the Martian sky. Phobos's phases, inasmuch as they can be observed from Mars, take 0.3191 days (Phobos's synodic period) to run their course, a mere 13 seconds longer than Phobos's sidereal period.

Solar transits 

An observer situated on the Martian surface, in a position to observe Phobos, would see regular transits of Phobos across the Sun. Several of these transits have been photographed by the Mars Rover Opportunity. During the transits, Phobos's shadow is cast on the surface of Mars; an event which has been photographed by several spacecraft. Phobos is not large enough to cover the Sun's disk, and so cannot cause a total eclipse.

Predicted destruction 
Tidal deceleration is gradually decreasing the orbital radius of Phobos by approximately two meters every 100 years, and with decreasing orbital radius the likelihood of breakup due to tidal forces increases, estimated in approximately 30–50 million years, with one study's estimate being about 43 million years.

Phobos's grooves were long thought to be fractures caused by the impact that formed the Stickney crater. Stress fractures calculated for this model line up with the grooves on Phobos. The model is supported with the discovery that some of the grooves are younger than others, implying that the process that produces the grooves is ongoing.

Given Phobos's irregular shape and assuming that it is a pile of rubble (specifically a Mohr–Coulomb body), it will eventually break up due to tidal forces when it reaches approximately 2.1 Mars radii. When Phobos is broken up, it will form a planetary ring around Mars. This predicted ring may last from 1 million to 100 million years. The fraction of the mass of Phobos that will form the ring depends on the unknown internal structure of Phobos. Loose, weakly bound material will form the ring. Components of Phobos with strong cohesion will escape tidal breakup and will enter the Martian atmosphere.

Origin 

The origin of the Martian moons is still controversial. Phobos and Deimos both have much in common with carbonaceous C-type asteroids, with spectra, albedo, and density very similar to those of C- or D-type asteroids. Based on their similarity, one hypothesis is that both moons may be captured main-belt asteroids. Both moons have very circular orbits which lie almost exactly in Mars's equatorial plane, and hence a capture origin requires a mechanism for circularizing the initially highly eccentric orbit, and adjusting its inclination into the equatorial plane, most probably by a combination of atmospheric drag and tidal forces, although it is not clear that sufficient time is available for this to occur for Deimos. Capture also requires dissipation of energy. The current Martian atmosphere is too thin to capture a Phobos-sized object by atmospheric braking. Geoffrey A. Landis has pointed out that the capture could have occurred if the original body was a binary asteroid that separated under tidal forces.

Phobos could be a second-generation Solar System object that coalesced in orbit after Mars formed, rather than forming concurrently out of the same birth cloud as Mars.

Another hypothesis is that Mars was once surrounded by many Phobos- and Deimos-sized bodies, perhaps ejected into orbit around it by a collision with a large planetesimal. The high porosity of the interior of Phobos (based on the density of 1.88 g/cm3, voids are estimated to comprise 25 to 35 percent of Phobos's volume) is inconsistent with an asteroidal origin. Observations of Phobos in the thermal infrared suggest a composition containing mainly phyllosilicates, which are well known from the surface of Mars. The spectra are distinct from those of all classes of chondrite meteorites, again pointing away from an asteroidal origin. Both sets of findings support an origin of Phobos from material ejected by an impact on Mars that reaccreted in Martian orbit, similar to the prevailing theory for the origin of Earth's moon.

Some areas of the surface have turned out to be reddish in color, while others are bluish. The hypothesis is that gravity pull from Mars makes the reddish regolith move over the surface, exposing relatively fresh, unweathered and bluish material from the moon, while the regolith covering it over time has been weathered due to exposure of solar radiation. Because the blue rock differs from known Martian rock, it could contradict the theory that the moon is formed from leftover planetary material after the impact of a large object.

Most recently, Amirhossein Bagheri (ETH Zurich), Amir Khan (ETH Zurich), Michael Efroimsky (US Naval Observatory) and their colleagues proposed a new hypothesis on the origin of the moons. By analyzing the seismic and orbital data from Mars InSight Mission and other missions, they proposed that the moons are born from disruption of a common parent body around 1 to 2.7 Billion years ago. The common progenitor of Phobos and Deimos was most probably hit by another object and shattered to form Phobos and Deimos.

Exploration

Launched missions 

Phobos has been photographed in close-up by several spacecraft whose primary mission has been to photograph Mars. The first was Mariner 7 in 1969, followed by Mariner 9 in 1971, Viking 1 in 1977, Phobos 2 in 1989 Mars Global Surveyor in 1998 and 2003, Mars Express in 2004, 2008, 2010 and 2019, and Mars Reconnaissance Orbiter in 2007 and 2008. On 25 August 2005, the Spirit rover, with an excess of energy due to wind blowing dust off of its solar panels, took several short-exposure photographs of the night sky from the surface of Mars, and was able to successfully photograph both Phobos and Deimos.

The Soviet Union undertook the Phobos program with two probes, both launched successfully in July 1988. Phobos 1 was accidentally shut down by an erroneous command from ground control issued in September 1988 and lost while the craft was still en route. Phobos 2 arrived at the Mars system in January 1989 and, after transmitting a small amount of data and imagery but shortly before beginning its detailed examination of Phobos's surface, the probe abruptly ceased transmission due either to failure of the onboard computer or of the radio transmitter, already operating on the backup power. Other Mars missions collected more data, but no dedicated sample return mission has been performed.

The Russian Space Agency launched a sample return mission to Phobos in November 2011, called Fobos-Grunt. The return capsule also included a life science experiment of The Planetary Society, called Living Interplanetary Flight Experiment, or LIFE. A second contributor to this mission was the China National Space Administration, which supplied a surveying satellite called "Yinghuo-1", which would have been released in the orbit of Mars, and a soil-grinding and sieving system for the scientific payload of the Phobos lander. However, after achieving Earth orbit, the Fobos–Grunt probe failed to initiate subsequent burns that would have sent it to Mars. Attempts to recover the probe were unsuccessful and it crashed back to Earth in January 2012.

On 1 July 2020, the Mars orbiter of the Indian Space Research Organisation was able to capture photos of the body from 4,200 km away.

Missions considered 
In 1997 and 1998, the Aladdin mission was selected as a finalist in the NASA Discovery Program. The plan was to visit both Phobos and Deimos, and launch projectiles at the satellites. The probe would collect the ejecta as it performed a slow flyby (~1 km/s). These samples would be returned to Earth for study three years later. The Principal Investigator was Dr. Carle Pieters of Brown University. The total mission cost, including launch vehicle and operations was $247.7 million. Ultimately, the mission chosen to fly was MESSENGER, a probe to Mercury.

In 2007, the European aerospace subsidiary EADS Astrium was reported to have been developing a mission to Phobos as a technology demonstrator. Astrium was involved in developing a European Space Agency plan for a sample return mission to Mars, as part of the ESA's Aurora programme, and sending a mission to Phobos with its low gravity was seen as a good opportunity for testing and proving the technologies required for an eventual sample return mission to Mars. The mission was envisioned to start in 2016, was to last for three years. The company planned to use a "mothership", which would be propelled by an ion engine, releasing a lander to the surface of Phobos. The lander would perform some tests and experiments, gather samples in a capsule, then return to the mothership and head back to Earth where the samples would be jettisoned for recovery on the surface.

Proposed missions 

In 2007, the Canadian Space Agency funded a study by Optech and the Mars Institute for an uncrewed mission to Phobos known as Phobos Reconnaissance and International Mars Exploration (PRIME). A proposed landing site for the PRIME spacecraft is at the "Phobos monolith", a prominent object near Stickney crater. The PRIME mission would be composed of an orbiter and lander, and each would carry 4 instruments designed to study various aspects of Phobos's geology.

In 2008, NASA Glenn Research Center began studying a Phobos and Deimos sample return mission that would use solar electric propulsion. The study gave rise to the "Hall" mission concept, a New Frontiers-class mission under further study as of 2010.

Another concept of a sample return mission from Phobos and Deimos is OSIRIS-REx II, which would use heritage technology from the first OSIRIS-REx mission.

As of January 2013, a new Phobos Surveyor mission is currently under development by a collaboration of Stanford University, NASA's Jet Propulsion Laboratory, and the Massachusetts Institute of Technology. The mission is currently in the testing phases, and the team at Stanford plans to launch the mission between 2023 and 2033.

In March 2014, a Discovery class mission was proposed to place an orbiter in Mars orbit by 2021 to study Phobos and Deimos through a series of close flybys. The mission is called Phobos And Deimos & Mars Environment (PADME). Two other Phobos missions that were proposed for the Discovery 13 selection included a mission called Merlin, which would flyby Deimos but actually orbit and land on Phobos, and another one is Pandora which would orbit both Deimos and Phobos.

The Japanese Aerospace Exploration Agency (JAXA) unveiled on 9 June 2015 the Martian Moons Exploration (MMX), a sample return mission targeting Phobos. MMX will land and collect samples from Phobos multiple times, along with conducting Deimos flyby observations and monitoring Mars's climate. By using a corer sampling mechanism, the spacecraft aims to retrieve a minimum 10 g amount of samples. NASA, ESA, DLR, and CNES are also participating in the project, and will provide scientific instruments. The U.S. will contribute the Neutron and Gamma-Ray
Spectrometer (NGRS), and France the Near IR Spectrometer (NIRS4/MacrOmega). Although the mission has been selected for implementation and is now beyond proposal stage, formal project approval by JAXA has been postponed following the Hitomi mishap. Development and testing of key components, including the sampler, is currently ongoing. , MMX is scheduled to be launched in 2024, and will return to Earth five years later.

Russia plans to repeat Fobos-Grunt mission in the late 2020s, and the European Space Agency is assessing a sample-return mission for 2024 called Phootprint.

Human missions 
Phobos has been proposed as an early target for a human mission to Mars. The teleoperation of robotic scouts on Mars by humans on Phobos could be conducted without significant time delay, and planetary protection concerns in early Mars exploration might be addressed by such an approach.

Phobos has been proposed as an early target for a crewed mission to Mars because a landing on Phobos would be considerably less difficult and expensive than a landing on the surface of Mars itself. A lander bound for Mars would need to be capable of atmospheric entry and subsequent return to orbit without any support facilities, or would require the creation of support facilities in-situ. A lander instead bound for Phobos could be based on equipment designed for lunar and asteroid landings. Furthermore, due to Phobos's very weak gravity, the delta-v required to land on Phobos and return is only 80% of that required for a trip to and from the surface of the Moon.

It has been proposed that the sands of Phobos could serve as a valuable material for aerobraking during a Mars landing. A relatively small amount of chemical fuel brought from Earth could be used to lift a large amount of sand from the surface of Phobos to a transfer orbit. This sand could be released in front of a spacecraft during the descent maneuver causing a densification of the atmosphere just in front of the spacecraft.

While human exploration of Phobos could serve as a catalyst for the human exploration of Mars, it could be scientifically valuable in its own right.

Phobos as a space elevator for Mars

A space elevator could extend down from Phobos to Mars 6,000 km, about 28 kilometers from the surface, and just out of the atmosphere of Mars. A similar space elevator cable could extend out 6,000 km the opposite direction that would counterbalance Phobos. In total the space elevator would extend out over 12,000 km which would be below areostationary orbit of Mars (17,032 km). A rocket launch would still be needed to get the rocket and cargo to the beginning of the space elevator 28 km above the surface. The surface of Mars is rotating at 0.25 km/s at the equator and the bottom of the space elevator would be rotating around Mars at 0.77 km/s, so only 0.52 km/s of delta-v would be needed to get to the space elevator. Phobos orbits at 2.15 km/s and the outermost part of the space elevator would rotate around Mars at 3.52 km/s.

See also 
 List of natural satellites
 List of missions to the moons of Mars
 Phobos and Deimos in fiction
 Phobos monolith
 Transit of Phobos from Mars

References

External links 

 Phobos Profile at NASA's Solar System Exploration site
 HiRISE Phobos
 USGS Phobos nomenclature
 Asaph Hall and the Moons of Mars
 Flight around Phobos (movie)
 Animation of Phobos
 Scale of Phobos  
 Mars Express view of Phobos
 Phobos cartography (MIIGAiK Extraterrestrial Laboratory)

 
18770812
Moons of Mars
Articles containing video clips
Moons with a prograde orbit